The Fortress in Badaber is a Russian TV series about the events that occurred during the Afghan War. In the center of the plot is an uprising in the camp of Badaber. The uprising in Badaber camp was an episode of the Afghan war, during which on April 26, 1985 an unequal battle took place between the detachments of Afghan Mujahideen and the units of the regular Pakistani Army supporting them, on the one hand, and a group of Soviet and Afghan prisoners of war, on the other. The attempt of prisoners of war to free themselves from the camp failed. As a result of the two-day storming of the Badaber camp with the use artillery, the majority of prisoners of war were killed. The film, however, was created to show the union of Russians, and to show what the Russian hostages of the camp in Badaber went through.

Plot 
Afghanistan, spring of the 1985th. A column of the Soviet servicemen near the border with Pakistan detects the Soviet soldier who is tied with barbed wire to the barrier by mujahideen, who using the proximity of the border, constantly make raids to the neighboring territory. In Pakistan, in the fortress of Badaber, under the leadership of American instructors, militants are being trained. There is a need of an operation in Pakistan to neutralize them. The Minister of Defense of the Soviet Union will give an order to get rid of the fortress only after conducting the reconnaissance operation. The responsible for this must be the General Kolesov. The contractor must be the captain of the Main Intelligence Directorate (GRU), Yuri Nikitin. Kolesov personally arrives at the house of Nikitin, outside Moscow, where Nikitin, suspended from operations, lives with his wife Svetlana. However, she does not want to let her husband go to Afghanistan. Under the instructions of the GRU, the scout, Yuri Nikitin, disguised as a slave, enters the Pakistan fortress of Badaber. Nikitin must collect evidence of the existence of a training center for mujaheddin under the leadership of the CIA, and then, he must to send a signal to the Russian commanders that they send missiles to blow the base. Yuri makes a few shots, but because of the threat to be declassified, he throws the camera at the last moment. Then, he meets the local goldsmith who shows Nikitin the Soviet soldier medallions, one of which belongs to Nikitin's best friend – Mikhail Kolesov, who is already considered to be missing in the Soviet Union. So, Nikitin understands that in the fortress there is a secret prisoners of war camp – the Soviet soldiers – who are kept and may suffer during the storming of Badaber.  In this way, contrary to the original task of the GRU, the scout joins his compatriots. Nikitin goes into the fortress and sees on the territory of the fortress a group of Russian prisoners of war, among whom he recognizes his best friend Mikhail, the son of his commander, General Kolesov, who was considered missing for several years. Nikitin decided to stay and save the doomed to death the Russian soldiers. Once imprisoned, he inspires them to revolt.

Cast 
Sergey Marin - Yuri Nikitin (the main role – the captain of GRU)
Svetlana Ivanova - Svetlana (the wife of Nikitin)
Sergey Colesnikov - Sergey Vladimirovich Kolesov (the general of GRU)
Mikhail Dzhanibekyan - Hafiz (the militiaman of the People's Army of Afghanistan)
Ramil Sabitov - Amir
Alexander Alyoshkin - Ivanov
Irina Rozanova - Irina (the wife of the general Kolesov)
Vasily Mishenko - Sokolov (the minister of war, the marshal)
Ily Malanin - Mikhail (a son of Kolesov, a friend of Nikitin)
Alexander Fisenko - Ivolgin (the battalion commander)
Stanislav Kurach - Sichov (staff officer, lieutenant-general)
Marcin Stec - Jeffers (CIA instructor) etc.

Information about the film

Facts about the film 
 The film was made based on real events that occurred during the Afghan war.
 After the bombing of the fortress, only one participant of the uprising survived, after which he returned to the USSR.
 The fighting scenes were shot in the sandy quarry of the Krasnodar Territory, especially for the filming there were brought the old Soviet military technique of the 80s.
 In 1993, a film was produced based on the events in Badaber  – "Peshawar Waltz".

Mistakes in the film 
 In the series, the prisoners have tokens, although at that time even the officers did not have them.
 Flak jackets on soldiers are more modern than those that were used at that time.
 The protagonist of the series moves freely around the territory of the camp, which would naturally be impossible.
 Afghan mujahideen use AKS-74 assault rifles, which were not used by them in that war, as they could not produce cartridges for them.

Episodes

References

External links  
http://rosserial.net/serial/krepost-badaber.html
https://www.film.ru/movies/krepost-badaber
https://www.1tv.ru/news/2018-02-12/340861-zabytyy_podvig_vremen_afganskoy_voyny_v_novom_ostrosyuzhetnom_filme_krepost_badaber

2018 Russian television series debuts